Mavelikkara is a town in Alappuzha district, Kerala, India.

Mavelikkara may also refer to:

 Mavelikara (Lok Sabha constituency), a constituency in Kerala

People
 Mavelikkara Krishnankutty Nair (1920–1988), Carnatic Mridangam player
 Mavelikkara Velukkutty Nair, Indian mridangam player
 Mavelikkara S. R. Raju, Carnatic music percussionist
 Mavelikkara Prabhakara Varma (1928–2008), Indian carnatic singer